Time marketing is the research of timing in releasing a new product to the market.

Introduction
In marketing, there are different approaches to the introduction of a (new) product into the market. Marketers always try to create a segmentation of the market in order to focus their product offering. Segmentation can be done on demographic, behavioral, or other bases. According to this segmentation, different options of differentiation vis-à-vis the competition get evaluated and implemented. This is called positioning of the product. McCarthy’s 4 marketing P’s, product, placement, promotion, and pricing are repeatedly used to create good combination of product features at the right price, distributed via preferred distribution channels, and combined with an appealing promotion.

One aspect tends to be forgotten: purchase timing behaviour or simply, timing aspect. Time marketing researches and gives guidelines on when to position a product in the market. Not only competition, but also absolute time frames in a consumer’s life are considered.

Examples
An obvious example, known for years before any research was conducted on this matter, illustrates the importance of timing aspects in marketing. A fan is a typical example of a product that goes on sale according to laws of nature and therefore timing. In summer, department stores have promotions on fans, as higher temperatures urge consumers to purchase.

Research has found that products are bought by customers at different moments of the day and different days of the week. Approximately 80% of diaries are sold in the month of November. However, 75% of the diaries not sold in November (15% of the total market) are sold on a Monday.

References

Types of marketing
Time